The Vail Youth Symphony (VYS) orchestra, launched in the summer of 2014, is a youth orchestra that provides symphonic experience to young musicians in the Vail, Arizona area and surrounding communities. VYS strongly encourages members to be involved in any available school music programs.

VYS performances are held at the Vail Theatre of the Arts.

See also
 List of youth orchestras in the United States

References

External links
 Vail Youth Symphony

American youth orchestras
Youth organizations based in Arizona
Performing arts in Arizona